Georges Rollin (1912–1964) was a French film actor.

Selected filmography
 Ultimatum (1938)
 J'accuse! (1938)
 Notre-Dame de la Mouise (1941)
 The Last of the Six (1941)
 Annette and the Blonde Woman (1942)
 The Trump Card (1942)
 It Happened at the Inn (1943)
 The Man Without a Name (1943)
 Father Goriot (1945)
 The Woman with the Orchid (1952)
 The Cucuroux Family (1953)

References

Bibliography
 Greco, Joseph. The File on Robert Siodmak in Hollywood, 1941-1951. Universal-Publishers, 1999.

External links

1912 births
1964 deaths
French male film actors